The Palma Metro ([]) is a light metro system in Palma, Majorca, Spain. It was constructed between 2005 and 2007 at cost of 312 million euros and opened for service on 25 April 2007. In March 2013, an existing  rail line with nine stations was incorporated into metro system as the M2 line. 

In 2016, the Palma Metro carried 1.2 million passengers, an average of 3,288 per day.

Overview

The metro opened on 25 April 2007.  It runs from the city centre to University of the Balearic Islands, known locally as Universitat de les Illes Balears (UIB). Spanish authorities suspended operations on the line in September 2007 due to repeated flooding.  Services restarted on 28 July 2008 after a 46% cost overrun. Due to the short length of Line M1, the journey from the Intermodal to UIB can be done in less than 20 minutes. Trains run daily from 06:35 to 21:55; headways are every 15 minutes during peak hours, and every 30 minutes at other times. 

In November 2012, Consorci de Transports de Mallorca (CTM) announced that a second rail line would be added to the Palma Metro system, operating on a route that would serve nine stations between Plaça d'Espanya (Intermodal station) and Marratxí station. The establishment of this new line would pose no cost since it would utilize the existing infrastructure of CTM's already-operating three rail lines. Revenue service on the M2 line began on 13 March 2013. Headways on the M2 line are generally 20 minutes throughout the day. Because the M2 line operates on rail shared with Majorca's three commuter rail lines, it doesn't qualify as a true "metro standards" line like the M1 line does.

List of stations 

M1 serves 9 stations, and M2 lines serves 10 stations; the first three of these stations are served by both lines, and thus operate transfer stations between the lines (as well as with Mallorca's three commuter rail lines): 

See Majorca rail network for a network map and timings.

Future expansion
As early as 2005, prior to the opening of the metro, future extensions were proposed, including from Estació Intermodal to the Port of Palma, using an old tunnel underneath the city.

Parc BIT

In 2019, a one-station, 1.5 km extension of M1 from its current UIB terminus to the Parc Bit science and technology park was agreed, and is due to open in 2020. This extension is predicted to cost €11.5 million and carry 225,000 passengers annually.

Son Espases University Hospital

Network Map

References

External links 

 Serveis Ferroviaris de Mallorca (SFM)
 TIB - Consorci de Transports de Mallorca (CTM)
 Palma Metro at UrbanRail.net

Palma Metro
Underground rapid transit in Spain